Felipe Rodríguez (1759/60 – 1814/15) was a Spanish classical era composer.

Rodríguez was born in Madrid, possibly on 1 May 1760. At age ten, he went to the Escolania de Montserrat near Barcelona, which has existed as a musical institution since the 14th century. He became a priest in 1783 and shortly afterwards returned to Madrid, where he became an organist. His extant compositions mainly include organ and keyboard sonatas.

References 
 Sleeve/booklet notes from Cantus Records CD: Felipe Rodríguez: Fortepiano Works.

Spanish Classical-period composers
Spanish male composers
1760 births
1815 deaths
19th-century Spanish male musicians